The Huntington Beach Union High School District (HBUHSD) is a public school district serving portions of the Orange County cities of Huntington Beach, Fountain Valley, Garden Grove, and Westminster.

It oversees eleven sites, offering courses for students in grades 9–12. The union high school district also offers courses through an affiliated adult school. Its superintendent since January 2017 is Dr. Clint Harwick.

Board of Trustees

Current Trustees
Trustee Bonnie Castrey (1985–present)
Trustee Duane Dishno (2012–present)
Trustee Susan Henry (2000–present)
Trustee Kathleen Iverson (2010–present)
Trustee Michael Simons (1991–present)

Former Trustees
Former Trustee Brian Garland (2002-2012)
Former Trustee Matthew Harper (1998-2010)
Former Trustee Sallie Dashiell (1998-2002)
Former Trustee Bonnie Bruce (1990-2000)

List of schools

High schools
Huntington Beach High School
Fountain Valley High School
Edison High School
Marina High School
Ocean View High School
Westminster High School

Alternative Education Schools
Valley Vista High School (Continuation high school)
Coast High School (Independent Study) 
Huntington Beach Adult School (Adult Education)

Feeder districts
 Fountain Valley School District
 Huntington Beach City School District
 Ocean View School District
 Westminster School District

References

External links
Official site

School districts in Orange County, California
Education in Huntington Beach, California
Westminster, California
Education in Garden Grove, California
Fountain Valley, California
1903 establishments in California